The Royal Hospital for Women (RHW) is a specialist hospital for women and babies located in the suburb of Randwick in Sydney, New South Wales, Australia. The Royal Hospital for Women shares the Randwick Hospitals' Campus site with the Prince of Wales Hospital and the Sydney Children's Hospital, as well as the Prince of Wales Private Hospital.

History
The RHW began life in 1820 as a 'lying-in' hospital under auspices of the Benevolent Society. Elizabeth Macquarie, wife of the then Governor of New South Wales Lachlan Macquarie chaired a committee of the Society to establish the hospital.

By 1888 the RHW (then known as the Benevolent Society Asylum) became affiliated to the University of Sydney as a training hospital. Between 1901 and 1997 the hospital operated from its site in Paddington, New South Wales before moving to Randwick. In 1904 the hospital was granted royal patronage by King Edward VII and became the Royal Hospital for Women.

Services
The RHW reportedly provides the following services annually:
 Deliver more than 3,700 babies; 
 Care of more than 600 premature babies; 
 Treat more than 400 women for gynaecological cancer; 
 Provide breast cancer surgery for more than 80 women; 
 Attend to over 450 women requiring acute care services; 
 Help more than 600 women through endo-gynaecological procedures;
 Provide care for over 10,000 women who rely on a special partnership with the RHW.

The RHW forms a part of the South Eastern Sydney and Illawarra Area Health Service and is assisted by the fundraising efforts of the Royal Hospital for Women Foundation.

References

Hospitals established in 1820
Hospitals in Sydney
Hospital buildings completed in 1997
Organisations based in Australia with royal patronage
Teaching hospitals in Australia
1820 establishments in Australia
Paddington, New South Wales
Randwick, New South Wales